The Gloucester and Cheltenham Green Belt is a green belt environmental and planning policy that regulates the rural space throughout mainly the South West region of England. It is completely within the county of Gloucestershire. Essentially, the function of the designation is to prevent further convergence between the conurbations of Gloucester and Cheltenham. It is managed by local planning authorities on guidance from central government.

Geography
It is mainly within Tewkesbury district, with small portions within the fringes of the Cheltenham and Cotswold districts. Innsworth is the largest community within the green belt.

Landscape features and facilities within the area include Staverton Airport, Cheltenham Racecourse, rivers Chelt, Swilgate and Hyde Brook, Imjin Barracks and MOD Boddington, several parks and woods, Briarfields campsite, Churchdown and Crickley hills, and the Church of the Holy Trinity in Badgeworth.

Much of the boundary is formed by local roads such as the A38 and the M5. The green belt lies next to the Cotswold Area of Outstanding Natural Beauty. Due to it lying across the Gloucester-Cheltenham metropolitan area, responsibility and co-ordination lies with local unitary and district councils as these are the local planning authorities.

History
The green belt was first drawn up in 1968 with the Gloucestershire Development Plan. The Gloucestershire County Structure Plan in 1981 extended this to include an area north of Cheltenham to protect the green space between Cheltenham and Bishop's Cleeve. No portion was defined within Gloucester as the city boundary is drawn tightly around the urban area.

See also
 Green belt (United Kingdom)

References

External links
 Interactive map of green belt land

Green belts in the United Kingdom
Environment of Gloucestershire
Gloucester
Cheltenham